M33, M-33, or M.33 may refer to:

Roads
 M33 (Cape Town), a Metropolitan Route in Cape Town, South Africa
 M33 (Durban), a Metropolitan Route in Durban, South Africa
 M33 (Johannesburg), a Metropolitan Route in Johannesburg, South Africa
 M33 (Pretoria), a Metropolitan Route in Pretoria, South Africa
 M-33 (Michigan highway), a state highway in Michigan, United States

Military
 HMS M33, an M29-class monitor warship of the Royal Navy
 M33 cluster bomb, a Cold War-era U.S. biological cluster bomb
 M33 helmet, used by the Italian Army in World War II
 Miles M.33 Monitor, a 1944 twin engined British target tug aircraft
 M33 ball, a jacketed .50_BMG ammunition cartridge
 M33, US Army rocket launcher for the Honest John rocket

Other uses
 M33 (gene)
 M33 X-7, a black hole binary system in the Triangulum Galaxy
 Macchi M.33, an Italian racing flying boat of 1925
 Messier 33, or Triangulum Galaxy, a galaxy in the Local Group of galaxies
 Mike Tempesta (aka M.33), a rock guitarist
 Samsung Galaxy M33 5G, an Android-based smartphone
 M33, the postcode district of Sale, a town in Greater Manchester, England

See also 
 M33 in Andromeda, a collection of science fiction short stories by  A. E. van Vogt